Tolman "Toby" Gibson (April 17, 1942 – March 24, 1993) was an American boxer. He competed in the men's light middleweight event at the 1964 Summer Olympics.

1964 Olympic results
Below is the record of Tolman Gibson, an American light middleweight boxer who competed at the 1964 Tokyo Olympics:

 Round of 32: defeated Yot Sangthien (Thailand) referee stopped contest
 Round of 16: lost to Eddie Davies (Ghana) by decision, 0-5

References

1942 births
1993 deaths
American male boxers
Olympic boxers of the United States
Boxers at the 1964 Summer Olympics
People from Idabel, Oklahoma
Light-middleweight boxers